Nervy Nat Kisses the Bride is a surviving 1904 silent film short comedy produced by Thomas Edison and directed by Edwin S. Porter and preserved from a paper print in the Library of Congress.

References

External links
 Nervy Nat Kisses the Bride at IMDb.com

1904 films
American silent short films
Articles containing video clips
Films directed by Edwin S. Porter
Edison Manufacturing Company films
American black-and-white films
Silent American comedy films
1904 comedy films
1900s English-language films
1900s American films